IHG may refer to:

 International Horror Guild Award, presented by the International Horror Guild from 1995 to 2008
 International Hospitals Group 
 InterContinental Hotels Group